Dannecker is a German surname. Notable people with the surname include:

Martin Dannecker (born 1942), German sexologist and author
Theodor Dannecker (1913–1945), German SS Hauptsturmführer (captain)

See also
Johann Heinrich von Dannecker (1758–1841), German sculptor

German-language surnames
German toponymic surnames